Candice Guerero (born 15 April 1990) is a Trinidadian netball player who plays for Trinidad and Tobago in the positions of center or wing defense. She has featured for the national side in three World Cup tournaments in 2011, 2015 and in 2019. She has also represented Trinidad and Tobago at the 2014 Commonwealth Games. She has been playing in international netball since making her debut in 2009.

References 

1990 births
Living people
Trinidad and Tobago netball players
Netball players at the 2014 Commonwealth Games
Commonwealth Games competitors for Trinidad and Tobago
People from San Fernando, Trinidad and Tobago
2019 Netball World Cup players